In Wrong is a 1919 American silent comedy film directed by James Kirkwood and produced by and starring Jack Pickford. It was released through First National Exhibitors.

Cast
Jack Pickford as Johnny Spivins
Marguerite De La Motte as Millie Fields
Clara Horton as Dolly Sheldon
George Dromgold as Morgan Coleman
Hardee Kirkland as Henry Wallace
Robin Williamson as Val Heaton
Lydia Knott as Johnny's mother
Pard as Pard, a dog

uncredited
May Robson as woman visiting store

Preservation status
In Wrong is preserved in the Library of Congress film collection.

References

External links

Media concerning the film (archived)

1919 films
1919 comedy films
Silent American comedy films
American silent feature films
Films directed by James Kirkwood Sr.
American black-and-white films
First National Pictures films
1910s American films